Mamasani may refer to:
 Mamasani County, an administrative subdivision of Iran
 Mamasani, a Luri tribe
 Mamasani, Chaharmahal and Bakhtiari, a village in Iran